Dilabifilum is a genus of thalloid green algae comprising approximately 4 species. The thalli take a crustose form. Choreonema reproduces by means of conceptacles; it produces tetraspores and dispores and carpospores. It is a source of agar.

Species
The species currently recognised are: Dilabifilum arthropyreniae and Dilabifilum prostratum.

References

External links

Ulvophyceae genera
Ulvales